Prang is a town and a capital of the Pru East District, a district in the Bono East Region of Ghana. Most people in the town are a farmers and traders.

Education 
Prang Senior High School, a second cycle institution is in the town.

References 

Populated places in Ghana